Brezovica na Bizeljskem (in older sources also Brezje) is a settlement south of Bizeljsko in the Municipality of Brežice in eastern Slovenia. The area is part of the traditional region of Styria. It is now included in the Lower Sava Statistical Region. The settlement includes the hamlets of Gmajna, Stari Dom, Zaklen, and Kokotinjek.

Name
The name of the settlement was changed from Brezovica to Brezovica na Bizeljskem in 1953. In the past the German name was Birkdorf.

References

External links
Brezovica na Bizeljskem on Geopedia

Populated places in the Municipality of Brežice